Phyllis Fife (born 1948) is a Muscogee Creek painter and educator from Oklahoma.

Personal life and education
Fife was born near Dustin, Oklahoma to James Fife and Carmen Griffin Fife. She belongs to the Raccoon clan and Tukvpvtce Tribal Town. She was first educated in a rural school before enrolling in the Institute of American Indian Arts in Santa Fe from 1963 until 1966. She studied under Howard Warshaw at the University of California, Santa Barbara and transferred to the University of Oklahoma in 1970. At OU, she earned her BFA degree in 1973. She then earned her Master of Education degree at Northeastern State University and her Doctor of Education degree from the University of Arkansas.

Fife has three daughters.

Art career
Fife was a fashion designer and painter, who exhibited in Oklahoma and nationalwide. Along with her sisters Sharon Fife Mouss, Sandy Fife Wilson and Jimmie Carole Fife Stewart, who are also visual artists, she launched the Fife Collection, a fashion design company that incorporated Southeastern Woodland aesthetics and was based in Henryetta, Oklahoma.

Education career
Phyllis Fife has taught at Northeastern Oklahoma State University (NSU) and Southeastern Oklahoma State University. She served as the director of the Center for Tribal Studies at NSU from 2003  to 2014 and coordinated NSU's Symposium of the American Indian for many years in Tahlequah.

Honors
In 2013, Fife was inducted into the Muscogee (Creek) Nation's Muskoke Hall of Fame.

References

External links
Oral History Interview with Phyllis Fife

1948 births
Living people
Native American painters
Native American women artists
American women painters
20th-century American painters
20th-century American women artists
21st-century American painters
21st-century American women artists
University of California, Santa Barbara alumni
University of Oklahoma alumni
Northeastern State University faculty
Southeastern Oklahoma State University faculty
Muscogee (Creek) Nation people
People from Hughes County, Oklahoma
Painters from Oklahoma
Indigenous fashion designers of the Americas
American women fashion designers
American women academics
20th-century Native Americans
21st-century Native Americans
20th-century Native American women
21st-century Native American women
American educators
American women educators